Savenko is a gender-neutral Slavic surname. Notable people with the surname include:

Galina Savenko (1966–2012), Soviet sprint canoer
Ivan Savenko (1924–1987), Soviet painter
Yuri Savenko, Russian psychiatrist
Yury Savenko, (1961–2020), Russian politician

See also
 

Ukrainian-language surnames